Salah Eddine Mraouni (born December 28, 1992) is a Moroccan cyclist.

Major results

2012
 Challenge du Prince
5th Trophée de l'Anniversaire
10th Trophée de la Maison Royale
 Les Challenges de la Marche Verte
6th GP Oued Eddahab
9th GP Al Massira
2013
 Les Challenges de la Marche Verte
6th GP Oued Eddahab
9th GP Al Sakia El Hamra
2014
 1st  Road race, National Under-23 Road Championships
 2nd Road race, National Road Championships
 Challenge du Prince
2nd Trophée de la Maison Royale
4th Trophée de l'Anniversaire
5th Trophée Princier
 3rd  Time trial, Arab Cycling Championships
 3rd Critérium International de Sétif
 5th Overall Grand Prix Chantal Biya
1st  Points classification
1st  Mountains classification
1st Stage 2
 5th Overall Tour of Rwanda
1st Stages 4 & 7
 6th Overall Tour International de Sétif
 7th Overall Tour du Maroc
1st Young rider classification
 8th Critérium International d'Alger
 10th Overall La Tropicale Amissa Bongo
2015
 1st Overall UCI Africa Tour
 Les Challenges de la Marche Verte
1st GP Sakia El Hamra
2nd GP Oued Eddahab
2nd GP Al Massira
 Challenge du Prince
1st Trophée Princier
2nd Trophée de l'Anniversaire
4th Trophée de la Maison Royale
 2nd Circuit d'Alger
 Challenge des phosphates
2nd GP de Khouribga
4th GP Fkih Ben Saleh
7th GP Ben Guerir
 7th Overall Tour d'Egypte
1st  Sprints classification
 8th Overall La Tropicale Amissa Bongo
1st Stage 6 (TTT)
2016
 1st Stage 1 Tour du Maroc
 African Road Championships
3rd  Team time trial
10th Road race
 5th Overall Tour du Cameroun
1st Mountains classification
 5th Overall Tour de Côte d'Ivoire
2017
 1st Overall Tour du Faso
 1st Stage 6 Tour du Maroc
 2nd Overall Tour du Cameroun
1st Points classification
1st Stages 4 & 8
 3rd Overall Tour of Xingtai
 3rd GP Al Massira, Les Challenges de la Marche Verte
 4th Overall La Tropicale Amissa Bongo
 6th Trophée Princier, Challenge du Prince
2018
 9th Overall La Tropicale Amissa Bongo

References

External links
 
 
 

1992 births
Living people
Moroccan male cyclists
People from Fez, Morocco